Halls Creek may refer to:

Halls Creek, Western Australia, a town in Australia
Halls Creek (Ohio), a stream in Ohio
Halls Creek (Utah), a stream in Utah